The Paulinskill Viaduct, also known as the Hainesburg Viaduct, is a reinforced concrete railroad bridge that crosses the Paulins Kill in Knowlton Township, New Jersey. When completed in 1910, it was the largest reinforced concrete structure in the world.

History 

The viaduct was built by the Delaware, Lackawanna and Western Railroad as part of the Lackawanna Cut-Off, a project that replaced an older route with a straighter and flatter route through the mountains of northwestern New Jersey. (A sister bridge of similar design but smaller dimension, the Delaware River Viaduct, carries the Lackawanna Cut-Off over the river, Interstate 80, and the New Jersey-Pennsylvania state line.) Designed by the DL&W's engineering staff under the supervision of chief engineer Lincoln Bush and built by the Philadelphia contracting firm of Reiter, Curtis & Hill, the bridge was considered a pioneering work that opened the door to the building of even larger concrete viaducts by the Lackawanna, most notably the Tunkhannock Viaduct in Pennsylvania in 1915.

Opened to regular rail traffic on Christmas Eve 1911, the Paulinskill Viaduct, supported by its seven graceful arches, carried DL&W trains until 1960, when the railroad merged with the Erie Railroad to form the Erie Lackawanna Railroad. The E-L in turn operated the Cut-Off until 1976 when the railroad was conveyed into Conrail, which ran trains until 1979, abandoned the line in 1982, and removed the tracks in 1984.

NJT has proposed to restore the rest of the Cut-Off, including the Paulinskill Viaduct, and restore passenger service into northeastern Pennsylvania, possibly as far as Scranton.

The Paulinskill Viaduct is also known for its internal chambers (used to inspect the structural integrity of the bridge), which are popular among those who enjoy urban exploration. The graffiti-filled chambers have been featured on Weird NJ.

Notes

References

External links
The Wonders of Paulinskill Viaduct at weirdnj.com

Bridges completed in 1910
Railroad bridges in New Jersey
Delaware, Lackawanna and Western Railroad bridges
Bridges in Warren County, New Jersey
Deck arch bridges in the United States
Viaducts in the United States
Lackawanna Cut-Off
Former railway bridges in the United States
Concrete bridges in the United States